Kemp's longbill (Macrosphenus kempi) is a species of Old World warbler in the family Macrosphenidae.
It is found in Cameroon, Ivory Coast, Ghana, Guinea, Liberia, Nigeria, and Sierra Leone.
Its natural habitat is subtropical or tropical moist lowland forests.

References

Kemp's longbill
Birds of West Africa
Kemp's longbill
Taxonomy articles created by Polbot